The Worst Witch is a series of children's books written and illustrated by Jill Murphy. They have been adapted into various films and television shows.

Mildred Hubble
Series Duration: 1998–2001, 2005
Mildred Hubble is the titular character of The Worst Witch series. Unlike the other girls at Miss Cackle's Academy for Witches, she doesn't come from a regular witch family, but was given a scholarship which greatly impressed Miss Cackle. She is best friends with Maud Spellbody and Enid Nightshade. In The Worst Witch, although inadvertently ruining a broomstick display while she was lead, as she was given a sabotaged broomstick, she saves the whole academy from Miss Cackle's jealous and evil identical twin sister Agatha Cackle, who was seeking to turn all the teachers and pupils into frogs. In the nick of time, Mildred turns Agatha and the rest of her fiendish coven into snails.

In The Worst Witch Strikes Again Miss Cackle trusts her to look after the new girl, Enid Nightshade, much to the chagrin of both Maud and Miss Hardbroom.

In A Bad Spell for the Worst Witch Mildred is turned into a frog by Ethel Hallow where she discovers a frog-magician Algernon Rowan-Webb and manages to have him turned back into a human.

In The Worst Witch All at Sea she sneakily brings Tabby, her bumbling tabby cat along to Grim Cove with her, instead of her new, ordinary black cat Ebony.

In The Worst Witch Saves the Day she once again saves the academy from the ruthless Agatha Cackle (who sneaked into the school disguised as a new teacher Miss Granite, with a high-pitched, squeaky voice, a huge cloud of orange curls, and an extremely bizarre personality) who tried to turn the whole academy into snails.

In The Worst Witch to the Rescue her project is stolen by the ruthless Ethel Hallow who also gets her banned from art lessons with Miss Mould after Ethel turned her clay pot into five rattlesnakes. In the same book, Mildred also pulls off a daring rescue of rescuing her talking pet tortoise from a tall pine tree after Drusilla Paddock hid him there under Ethel's orders, and is granted permission to keep the tortoise once he returns to normal.

In The Worst Witch and the Wishing Star, as she starts fourth year, Mildred is promoted to Lantern Monitor of the school. When she makes an idle wish on a shooting star, she finds herself with an unexpected new pet in the form of a dog, Star, who displays a surprising aptitude for doing tricks on the broomstick. Although there is some objection to Star's presence, after he and Mildred help Cackle's win a competition among three different schools to earn money for a new swimming-pool (albeit after Star accidentally ruined their original plans for a broomstick ballet display), Mildred is granted special permission for Star to be her broomstick companion instead of Tabby.

Despite being clumsy and bumbling, Mildred's intentions are good and she is well-meaning, despite almost getting expelled in The Worst Witch Strikes Again. Although she has trouble training her cat, Tabby- who is grey with black stripes rather than the required black as they 'ran out of black ones' when handing out cats-, Mildred is nevertheless very fond of him, enjoying cuddling up to him in bed, and even risking expulsion to take him with her on holiday after she is forced to give him up in The Worst Witch All at Sea, and is upset when they suggest that her new dog Star replace Tabby as her broomstick companion until Miss Cackle clarifies that they intend for Tabby to remain as her general pet. She also has three bats in her room, which she has named Winky, Blinky, and Nod in the series; by the fourth book in the series, the number of bats has grown to eight.

Mildred is tall and thin and has long, waist-length, black hair which she wears in two messy pigtails, whereas in The Worst Witch Saves the Day, Mildred has what Miss Hardbroom calls "a bad hair day", after borrowing Maud's styling brush and getting her hair tangled in it. Ethel chops off the styling brush but then cuts off all of Mildred's hair to hide it. In a false attempt at kindness, Ethel gave Mildred a hair-growth potion which, unfortunately, makes Mildred's hair grow so long and so fast that it practically engulfs the whole school.

In the 1986 film, Mildred is portrayed by Fairuza Balk. In the original 1998 TV series, Mildred was portrayed by Georgina Sherrington. In the 2017 remake, Mildred is portrayed by Bella Ramsey (although in the episode "The Best Teacher", Mildred is portrayed by Rachel Bell when she is temporarily aged into an older woman by what was meant to be a wisdom spell) and by newcomer Lydia Page in Season four, after Ramsey left the series. Both TV adaptations establish that Mildred is the 'worst witch' because she is the first student at Cackle's to originate from a non-magical background; the 1998 version has her receive a scholarship for an imaginative piece of creative writing and the 2017 version has her learn about Cackle's and magic because she helped Maud get to the school on her first day after Maud crashed into her balcony.  It is revealed in the season two finale of the 2017 series that actually Mildred's ancestors were magic, but her great-grandmother thirteen generations back sacrificed twelve generations of magic to reignite a founding stone. In Season four, after a sabotage by Ethel, who had substituted an appearance-spell to prevent Mildred from applying for head girl, during her potion experiment, which causes Mildred with a whole new look: a redhead with blue eyes. Mildred tried to complete three impossible challenges and reverse the spell before the sun goes down. Mildred becomes stuck in her new look, when she fails to complete the last impossible challenge. Mildred is becoming powerful, since she and Maud correctly perform the Transference Spell in sync. She later meets her father Spike Jones and her younger half-sister Isabella "Izzy" Jones, after Mildred saves Izzy on her first day of school during a flying accident involving her broom. At the end of Season four, she becomes the new head girl after saving the school from Agatha Cackle and Ethel is on good terms with Mildred after making peace with her.

Maud Spellbody
Maud Spellbody is first introduced as Mildred's best friend. She breaks off her friendship with Mildred in The Worst Witch Strikes Again after growing jealous of Mildred's apparent friendship with the new girl, Enid Nightshade. She later reverts her friendship to Mildred after Ethel locks them in a store cupboard and makes friends with Enid. She is short and chubby with glasses and hair is worn in bunches (in A Bad Spell for the Worst Witch she wore pigtails and in The Worst Witch Saves the Day she has curly bunches instead of straight ones). She is fiercely loyal to Mildred and Enid and has stood up to Ethel many times, most notably in The Worst Witch All at Sea where she reprimands Ethel about eavesdropping on a conversation between her and Enid about Mildred acting strangely.

There is also some inconsistency regarding Maud's surname. In the 1986 film, gave her surname as "Warlock". The 1998 TV series gave her surname as "Moonshine", but it is never referred to as this in the books; in fact Miss Hardbroom scathingly addresses her as Maud "Spellbody" in The Worst Witch All at Sea. The 1980s Halloween television movie gave her surname as "Warlock". Later books, including Fun with the Worst Witch (2014) gave her surname as 'Spellbody' however.

In the 1986 film, Maud is portrayed by Danielle Batchelor.

In The Worst Witch (TV series), Maud was played by Emma Brown. Her chubbiness is dropped but her small stature, bunches, glasses, and loyalty towards her friends remain intact. She has also sprung to Mildred's defense several times, such as in the episode "Learning the Hard Way" where she comments to Miss Hardbroom that Mildred would never have any confidence if she kept shouting at her. It was the 2017 TV series that popularized Maud's surname as the most commonly known Spellbody. Maud was played by Danielle Bachelor in the 80's Halloween movie.

In the 2017 CBBC version of The Worst Witch, Megan Hughes plays Maud in Series 2. In the first series of the CBBC version she is played by Meibh Campbell.

Enid Nightshade 
Enid Nightshade is Mildred's second-best friend who is introduced in The Worst Witch Strikes Again where she has hair "the colour of milky tea" wearing it in a thick plait and having large limbs. Mildred is assigned to look after her by Miss Cackle. Enid at first appears to be dull and boring but turns out to be a wild practical joker/prankster who is more likely to get the three into trouble than Mildred is. She unintentionally causes trouble for Mildred throughout the novel, even to the point where Miss Cackle threatens to expel Mildred if there is any more bother from her. Nevertheless, Enid is just as loyal as Maud is and provides comfort and support to Mildred in the following books of the series. Enid is the second-worst witch in the Academy, as both she and Mildred are hapless at broomstick riding and lack the specific requirements to be a fully-fledged, efficient witch. In the TV series, Enid was portrayed by Jessica Fox. In the new BBC reboot, Enid was portrayed by newcomer Tamara Smart.

Ethel Hallow 
Ethel Hallow is the snobbish, stuck-up, vindictive, and sly rival and enemy of Mildred and her friends. She is favoured by Miss Hardbroom, but appears to have no friends, apart from the rarely seen Drusilla Paddock, who is just as bad as Ethel. Ethel is described as being "one of those lucky people for whom everything goes right" which is what caused her to become so snobby. Ethel is tall and thin (just like Mildred) and has blonde hair which she wears in a ponytail with a black hair ribbon. She also has a very spiky nose (pointed out by Maud in A Bad Spell for the Worst Witch). Various commentaries have noted that Ethel's primary weakness as a student is that, which she is able to easily follow the rules and perform new spells after the demonstration, she lacks the ability to imagine and improvise when given free rein. This was demonstrated most clearly in The Worst Witch to the Rescue, when she was the student who performed worst in the art class and had no ideas whatsoever for a summer project to research a spell of the student's choice as she lacked a framework for her to start studying in, in contrast to Mildred who not only performed best in art but had even created a completely new spell for the project.

Ethel Hallow in the books 
 In The Worst Witch, Ethel is turned into a pig by Mildred Hubble after persistently taunting her about her tabby cat's inability to fly properly on a broomstick. In revenge, Ethel jinxes the spare broom she lends Mildred, ruining Mildred's broomstick performance in front of Grand Wizard Egbert Hellibore. 
 In The Worst Witch Strikes Again, she locks Mildred and Enid in an abandoned store cupboard. 
 In A Bad Spell for the Worst Witch, she turns Mildred into a frog to get even with her for calling her younger sister Sybil Hallow a "weed". 
 In The Worst Witch All at Sea, she casts off a boat containing Tabby and an unconscious Miss Hardbroom from the breakwater, thus nearly causing them to be lost at sea. 
 In The Worst Witch Saves the Day. she shears all of Mildred's hair off then gives her a hair regrowth potion that causes Mildred's hair to grow out-of-control, and she also hides Tabby on the roof. 
 Ethel's most villainous role is in The Worst Witch to the Rescue, in which she gets Mildred banned from art lessons by turning her clay pot into five rattlesnakes out of jealousy that Mildred was doing better than her, and steals Mildred's summer project of a spell that can allow animals to talk for two weeks, passing it off as her own, filling Mildred's project folder with sheets of paper with smiley faces scrawled on. She also gets Drusilla to hide Mildred's talking pet tortoise up a tree to prevent him from revealing the truth about the project, but this backfires on her when Mildred saves the tortoise and presents him to Miss Cackle and Miss Hardbroom as a witness. 
 In The Worst Witch and the Wishing Star, Ethel has been promoted to Lantern Monitor in fourth year, along with Mildred and Drusilla, but it is noted that she is on a tight leash after her previous actions. Realising that Mildred has something hidden in a bag, Ethel is able to expose Mildred's new pet dog, Star, but the subsequent scuffle causes destroys the costumes that would have been used for Form Five's broomstick ballet.

Because of her nasty ways, Ethel is sometimes seen as a bully. Yet her actions are instrumental in setting up the climax of nearly every novel.
In The Worst Witch the jinx she puts on the broomstick results in Mildred running away into the woods rather than face Miss Cackle. If Mildred hadn't run away she wouldn't have spotted Agatha Cackle and her coven.
In The Worst Witch Strikes Again, if she hadn't locked Mildred and Enid in the store cupboard they would never have flown into the Great Hall to do a performance and improve Maud's speech.
In A Bad Spell for the Worst Witch, if Ethel hadn't turned Mildred into a frog, Mildred wouldn't have discovered Algernon Rowan-Webb and he would have remained a frog for the rest of his life.
In The Worst Witch All at Sea, if she hadn't set the boat adrift, the legendary treasure chest on Cat's Head Rock wouldn't have been discovered.
In The Worst Witch Saves the Day, if Ethel hadn't left Tabby on the roof then Miss Granite wouldn't have picked him up and Mildred wouldn't have found out Miss Granite was actually Agatha Cackle in disguise.
While she is a straightforward bully in The Worst Witch to the Rescue, where the main threat is Ethel stealing Mildred's summer project to pass off as her own, Ethel returns to her traditional role of unwittingly provoking success in The Worst Witch and the Wishing Star, where her attempts to expose Mildred's new dog Star result in Mildred being granted permission to use Star as her broom companion rather than Tabby after she and Star win an inter-school competition.

Ethel Hallow in the Film and TV series 
In the 1986 film, Ethel is portrayed by Anna Kipling.

In the 1998 ITV series, Ethel is played by Felicity Jones in the first series and Katy Allen in the second and third series. Jones later reprised her role in Weirdsister College. The excuse for the change of actress, as explained in the first episode of the second series "Old Hats and New Brooms", was Ethel having a makeover (or a "witch-over" in their case) during the holidays.

In the 2017 CBBC series, Ethel is portrayed by newcomer Jenny Richardson. This version of Ethel is still intelligent, but is particularly driven to 'prove' herself as her elder sister Esmerelda is a third-year at Cackle's who is generally seen as the school's best student. Her vendetta against Mildred begins in the selection day tests, when Ethel's attempt to prove herself by creating a potion that would turn her into a dragon is inadvertently sabotaged by Mildred; Mildred 'stole' part of a key ingredient from Ethel's potion because she needed it for her own levitation spell, with the result that Ethel's spell turned her instead into a worm. As the series continues, Ethel attempts to undermine Mildred and affirm her own place in the school, but her own nature often works against her as her attempts at 'heroism' typically involve making others look bad rather than putting herself at risk, such as stealing the school's Founding Stone to try and restore Esmerelda's magic after she was the reason her sister lost her powers in the first place, or creating a duplicate of Indigo Moon- another student from a non-witching background- that would attack the school so that Ethel could defeat the duplicate, unable to recognise the difference between building herself up and genuinely helping others.

At the end of the series, after Mildred becomes Head Girl, Ethel makes amends with her and end up on good terms.

Miss Hardbroom 
Miss Joy Hecate Hardbroom is the terrifying and extremely strict deputy headmistress of Mildred, Maud, Enid, Ethel, and Drusilla. She is tall, thin and bony with waist-length black hair which she keeps "scragged into such a tight knot that her forehead looked quite stretched". Miss Hardbroom favours Ethel Hallow but has the complete opposite attitude to Mildred Hubble. Miss Hardbroom is even terrifying enough to reduce any pupil to a gibbering heap with one word. Despite seeming cruel, Miss Hardbroom's soft side does come through on occasions, such as her "brief flicker of friendliness" at the end of The Worst Witch Saves the Day and her admitting her error of judgement in The Worst Witch to the Rescue after it is revealed that Ethel stole Mildred's summer project for herself, Maud noting in The Worst Witch and the Wishing Star that Miss Hardbroom's dislike of cheats means that Ethel will be under close watch.

In the books and earlier TV series, Miss Hardbroom’s first name is Constance.

In the 1986 film, Miss Hardbroom is portrayed by Diana Rigg. In the 1998 TV series she is portrayed by Kate Duchêne, and in The New Worst Witch by Caroline O'Neill. In the 2017 CBBC series she is called Miss Hecate Hardbroom and played by Raquel Cassidy.

References